"Be Together" is a song recorded by American music group Major Lazer featuring fellow American music group Wild Belle, as the opening track of the former's third studio album, Peace Is the Mission (2015). It is also Major Lazer's fourth promotional single. The song may have risen to prominence when trap artist Vanic released a remix of a song to his SoundCloud account, and has since been featured on numerous EDM records and channels.

On November 20, 2015, Major Lazer released the Australazer EP, which features six remixes of "Be Together" by various Australian EDM artists. The official music video was published on January 19, 2016, through Major Lazer's official YouTube channel.

Charts

Weekly charts

Year-end charts

References

2015 songs
Major Lazer songs
Songs written by Diplo
Songs written by Djemba Djemba